Ballouhey, Ballouey, or Balloué are variants of a French surname. The name exists mainly in France in Isère and in Paris, as well as in South Africa. The etymology of the name is disputed; it originates either from Occitan or from Franche-Comté or from Basel.

List of Ballouheys in historical order (by date of birth):
 Jean-Claude Ballouhey (1764-1846), born at Citey (Haute-Saône, Franche-Comté), intendant of French impératrice Marie-Louise of Austria
 André Ballouhey, 20th-century engraver and lithographer from Lorraine who lived at Saint-Marcellin, Isère
 Bertrand Ballouhey, former French rugby player at Villeneuve Leopards
 Laurent Ballouhey (1947-2014) 是什么意思, sinologist, translator inter alia of Ai Qing, of a graphic-biopic of Cáo Xuěqín, journalist at L'Humanité in China from 1982 to 2013
 Jean Ballouhey, President of French rugby club Gifi Bias XIII, son of Bertrand Ballouhey

Surnames of French origin
Surnames of Swiss origin
French-language surnames
Swiss-language surnames